According to the Law of Ukraine No. 317-VIII "About condemning Communist and National-Socialist (Nazi) totalitarian regimes in Ukraine and banning propaganda of their symbols", names of over 3% of populated places in Ukraine are subjected to change.

Legends and legal references 
The following are a series of resolutions that the Verkhovna Rada of Ukraine has passed regarding decommunization through the renaming of populated places:
 Resolution (RVRU) 984-VIII, adopted 4 February 2016, entered into force on 18 February 2016
 Resolution (RVRU) 1037-VIII, adopted 17 March 2016, entered into force on 2 April 2016
 Resolution (RVRU) 1351-VIII, adopted 12 May 2016, entered into force on 22 May 2016
 Resolution (RVRU) 1352-VIII, adopted 12 May 2016, did not enter into force yet
 Resolution (RVRU) 1353-VIII, adopted 12 May 2016, entered into force on 22 May 2016
 Resolution (RVRU) 1374-VIII, adopted 19 May 2016, entered into force on 3 June 2016
 Resolution (RVRU) 1377-VIII, adopted 19 May 2016, entered into force on 3 June 2016

Status of populated places:
 underlined centers of regions
 bold marked centers of districts
 italic marked centers of united territorial communities (for communities where already took place or scheduled elections)

Note: names of administrative units to which are subordinated other administrative units or populated places indicated as of 1 January 2016.

Administrative units

Regions (oblasts) 
Since the regions' names in Ukraine are prescribed in the Constitution, renaming changes should be made to the Constitution first.

Districts (raions)

Cities, villages

Autonomous Republic of Crimea 

The Autonomous Republic of Crimea is administered by the Russian Federation due to the 2014 Russian annexation of Crimea.

The Ministry of Temporarily Occupied Territories and Internally displaced persons is a government ministry in Ukraine that was officially established on 20 April 2016  to manage occupied parts of Donetsk, Luhansk and Crimea regions affected by Russian military intervention of 2014.

 International sanctions during the Ukrainian crisis
 Ministry of Temporarily Occupied Territories and IDPs
 Temporarily occupied and uncontrolled territories of Ukraine (2014-present)
 International reactions to the annexation of Crimea by the Russian Federation

Cherkasy Oblast

Chernihiv Oblast

Chernivtsi Oblast

Dnipropetrovsk Oblast

Donetsk Oblast

Ivano-Frankivsk Oblast 
 no places to rename

Kharkiv Oblast

Kherson Oblast

Khmelnytskyi Oblast

Kyiv 
 no places to rename (there are no other settlements subordinated to Kyiv City Council except for the City of Kyiv)

Kyiv Oblast

Kirovohrad Oblast

Luhansk Oblast

Lviv Oblast

Mykolaiv Oblast

Odessa Oblast

Poltava Oblast

Rivne Oblast

Sevastopol

Sumy Oblast

Ternopil Oblast

Vinnytsia Oblast

Volyn Oblast

Zakarpattia Oblast

Zaporizhzhia Oblast

Zhytomyr Oblast

See also
 List of streets renamed due to the 2022 Russian invasion of Ukraine
 List of renamed cities in Ukraine

References

External links
 Law of Ukraine № 317-VIII "About condemning Communist and National-Socialist (Nazi) totalitarian regimes in Ukraine and banning propaganda of their symbols". Verkhovna Rada website.

Toponyms changed as part of decommunization in 2016

Toponyms changed as part of decommunization in 2016
Toponyms changed as part of decommunization in 2016
Toponyms changed as part of decommunization in 2016
Toponyms changed as part of decommunization in 2016
Toponyms changed as part of decommunization in 2016
Toponyms changed as part of decommunization in 2016
Toponyms changed as part of decommunization in 2016
Geographical renaming
Changed as part of decommunization in 2016